The individual dressage in equestrian at the 1948 Olympic Games in London was held in Aldershot from 9 to 10 August. Swiss rider Hans Moser won the gold medal. The silver was won by André Jousseaume of France and the bronze by Swedish rider Gustaf Adolf Boltenstern, Jr. The sixth place finisher, Gehnäll Persson, was disqualified when it was discovered that he was only a noncommissioned officer and thus ineligible to compete.

Competition format
The team and individual dressage competitions used the same results. A test was to be carried out from memory by each rider within 13 minutes, losing half a point for every second over the time limit.

Results

References

External links
Organising Committee for the XIV Olympiad, The (1948). The Official Report of the Organising Committee for the XIV Olympiad. LA84 Foundation. Retrieved 4 September 2016.

Equestrian at the Summer Olympics